Cyrille Merville (born 14 April 1982) is a French football goalkeeper.

Career
Merville was born in Amiens, France. He signed for then-Ligue 1 side AC Arles-Avignon in the summer of 2009 from Troyes AC.

In June 2014, he signed a two-year contract with US Créteil-Lusitanos.

External links

References

1982 births
Living people
Sportspeople from Amiens
Association football goalkeepers
French footballers
Amiens SC players
ES Troyes AC players
AC Arlésien players
Nîmes Olympique players
US Créteil-Lusitanos players
Valenciennes FC players
Ligue 1 players
Ligue 2 players
Championnat National players
Footballers from Hauts-de-France